SM is a defunct Polish motorcycle manufacturer founded by Stefan Malcherek. They produced lightweight motorcycles in Poznań, Poland from 1937 to 1939 and also supplied engines to other manufacturers.

History
Stefan Malcherek established the SM Workshop in Poznań in 1924, which manufactured a 50 cc auxiliary engine that could be fitted to a bicycle. It was mounted above the front wheel and drove the wheel by means of a roller. At the 1935 Poznań Fair he presented a 2hp two-stroke outboard motor which was well received. He adapted the 98 cc engine for use in a motorcycle and constructed a light motorcycle around the engine. The machine debuted at a competition organised by the Unia motorcycling club in December 1937. Although the competition was won by a German Phanomen machine, the SM was seen to be a good competitor. The machine went into production and was well received for its reliability.

SM supplied the engine to two other Poznań manufacturers: Nowaczyk Brothers' Bicycle Manufacture for use in their WNP 3-wheelers and Automatyk for their Zuch 98cc motorbike. Production ceased following the German invasion of Poland in 1939.

SM 98
The unit construction 98 cc two-stroke engine was cast from  light alloy except the cylinder which was cast iron. It was fitted with a 2 speed gearbox, which was hand operated by a lever attached to the top of the gearbox. The engine produced 3 hp at 3,500 rpm.

A tubular, single loop frame with no rear suspension was used. Front forks were of the girder type. A single seat was fitted. The machine was known for its frugal fuel consumption and reliability.

References

Motorcycle manufacturers of Poland
1937 establishments in Poland
1939 disestablishments in Poland
Science and technology in Poland
Companies based in Poznań